Kora is a pan-African payment infrastructure company headquartered in Canada with offices in Nigeria and the United Kingdom. The fintech company enables local and global businesses to accept payins, make payouts, and get settled across popular payment channels across Africa.

History

Dickson Nsofor founded Kora in 2017. Later on, Gideon Orovwiroro and Bryan Uyanwune joined him as first employees.

At the time, the company focused on building financial tools for NGOs to disburse funds utilising the blockchain technology. The idea for the company came from Dickson Nsofor, who was at the time working for a fintech in London, HumanIQ, providing a solution to the problem of 60% of the world's population lacking full access to financial services.

Growth

Kora started as a remittance business. In 2019, the decision was made to pivot, making Kora into a B2B business that now offers the services it does. That same year, the company attended Techstars Toronto. 

Earlier in 2022, the company received a commercial PSSP license from the Central Bank of Nigeria. Later in the year, Kora expanded to the United Kingdom by partnering with the municipal government in Birmingham to open its first fully operational UK office. At the 2022 Commonwealth Games opening ceremony, Kora was announced as a new Commonwealth-sourced foreign direct investments (FDI) project for the West Midlands.

In July, the company was accused of fraud in Kenya, but the charges were dropped a few months later after investigations revealed no wrongdoing on the part of the company. Both Kenya Asset Recovery Agency and the Kenyan Department for Criminal Investigation found no evidence of fraud in the company's operations. In one court document, which was drawn and filed on the 19th of October 2022 by state counsel Stephen Githinji on behalf of the ARA director, the agency said that it has withdrawn its lawsuit in its entirety.

Services

Kora offers a payment application programming interface (API) to companies which gives them access to a suit of products and services including, Checkout, Payout, Payment Links, Virtual Bank Account, Dynamic Virtual Bank Account, Fixed Bank Account, mobile money payments acquiring, card acquiring, bulk payout  etc.

References

Nigerian companies established in 2017
Headquarters in Canada
Payment service providers